Jamaica competed at the 1994 Winter Olympics in Lillehammer, Norway. Six years after their famous first appearance at the Winter Olympics, the Jamaican four sled stunned many of their critics by finishing in 14th place, ahead of the United States, Russia, France and one sled from Italy.

Competitors
The following is the list of number of competitors in the Games.

Bobsleigh

References
 Official Olympic Reports

Nations at the 1994 Winter Olympics
1994 Winter Olympics
Olympics